St Andrew's Street is a street in Dublin, Ireland.

Location 
It runs from the junction of Exchequer Street, Wicklow Street and William Street in the south to Church Lane and Suffolk Street in the north. It is joined on its western side by Trinity Street and bordered on its eastern side by St Andrews Church.

History 
The street is named after St Andrew's Church, built in 1670 and designed by William Dobson. An ancient church was in the area from 1172 called Church of St Andrew de Thengmote and may have been preceded by a Viking temple. The western end of the street was named Hog Hill in 1728 until 1776 after Abbey of the Blessed Virgin Mary del Hogges. The current Church of St Andrew was built between 1860 and 1862 and was designed by W. H. Lynn.

The surgeon Philip Woodroffe lived in the street and died at his home there in 1799. He was buried in St Andrew's churchyard. The famous Restaurant Jammet stood on St Andrew's Street between 1901 and 1926.

See also
 Dublin 2

References

External links 

Streets in Dublin (city)